Annunciation of Our Most Holy Lady Church is an Orthodox church in Riga, the capital of Latvia. The church is situated at the address 9 Gogoļa Street.

References

External links 

Churches in Riga
Eastern Orthodox churches in Latvia
Church buildings with domes